Cleyera japonica (sakaki) is a flowering evergreen tree native to warm areas of Japan, Taiwan, China, Myanmar, Nepal, and northern India (Min and Bartholomew 2015). It can reach a height of 10 m. The leaves are 6–10 cm long, smooth, oval, leathery, shiny and dark green above, yellowish-green below, with deep furrows for the leaf stem. The bark is dark reddish brown and smooth. The small, scented, cream-white flowers open in early summer, and are followed later by berries which start red and turn black when ripe. Sakaki is one of the common trees in the second layer of the evergreen oak forests. It is considered sacred to Japanese Shintō faith, and is one of the classical offerings at Shintō shrines.

Uses

Sakaki wood is used for making utensils (especially combs), building materials, and fuel. It is commonly planted in gardens, parks, and shrines.

Shinto shrines are traditionally encircled with  consisting .

In the myth about Amaterasu and the cave she hid in, after Susanoo's tantrum, when the Yata no Kagami was forged and propped-up in front of Amaterasu's cave, it was said to have been perched-upon the branches of a sacred, 500-branched Sakaki tree facing the cave.

Linguistic background
The lexicographer Michael Carr notes:

In modern Japanese, sakaki is written  with a doubly exceptional logograph. It is an ideograph (in the proper sense of 'logograph representing an idea' rather than loosely 'Chinese character; logograph') and is a kokuji  'Japanese [not Chinese] logograph.' Ideograms and kokuji are two of the rarest logographic types, each constituting a small percentage of a typical written Japanese sample. First, the idea of sakaki is expressed with a melding of boku or ki  'tree' and shin or kami  'god; divine, sacred' [of Shinto ]; comparable to a graphic fusion of the word shinboku  'sacred tree.' Second, the sakaki  ideograph is a kokuji 'national [i.e., Japanese] logograph' rather than a usual kanji  'Chinese logograph' borrowing. Kokuji often denote Japanese plants and animals not native to China, and thus not normally written with Chinese logographs. (1995:11) 

Aston 1896:42–43, "True Sakaki tree of the Heavenly Mt. Kagu"). Sakaki ( or ) is the title of Chapter 10 in The Tale of Genji (ca. 1021). It comes from this context.

"May I at least come up to the veranda?" he asked, starting up the stairs. The evening moon burst forth and the figure she saw in its light was handsome beyond describing. Not wishing to apologize for all the weeks of neglect, he pushed a branch of the sacred tree in under the blinds. "With heart unchanging as this evergreen, This sacred tree, I enter the sacred gate." She replied: "You err with your sacred tree and sacred gate. No beckoning cedars stand before my house." And he: "Thinking to find you here with the holy maidens, I followed the scent of the leaf of the sacred tree." Though the scene did not encourage familiarity, he made bold to lean inside the blinds. (tr. Seidensticker 1976:187) 

The etymology of the pronunciation sakaki is uncertain. Carr (1995:13) cites Japanese tradition and historical phonology to support the latter etymon. The Shogakukan Kokugo Dai Jiten Dictionary entry for this term also notes that the pitch accent for sakayu – the origin of modern sakae – is different than what would be expected, suggesting that  may be the more likely derivation (Shogakukan 1988).

References
 Aston, William George, tr. 1896. Nihongi: Chronicles of Japan from the Earliest Times to A.D. 697. Kegan Paul. 1972 Tuttle reprint.
 Carr, Michael. 1995. "Sacred Twig and Tree: Tamagushi and Sakaki in Japanese-English Dictionaries", The Review of Liberal Arts 小樽商科大学人文研究 89:1–36.
 Chamberlain, Basil H., tr. 1919. The Kojiki, Records of Ancient Matters. 1981 Tuttle reprint.
Min, Tianlu and Bruce Bartholomew, 2015, Cleyera japonica, Missouri Botanical Garden and Harvard University Herbaria.
 Seidensticker, Edward G., tr. 1976. The Tale of Genji. Knopf.
Shogakukan, 1988, Kokugo Dai Jiten 国語大辞典, rev. ed., Shogakukan.

External links
Sakaki, Sacred Tree of Shinto, Mildred E. Mathias Botanical Garden newsletter 1999
Sakaki, Encyclopedia of Shinto
Shrubs: Cleyera japonica, NC State University Urban Horticulture
NOS CLEYERA PAGE, Plantnames.org

Pentaphylacaceae
Trees of Myanmar
Trees of China
Flora of India (region)
Trees of Nepal
Trees of Japan
Trees of Taiwan
Shinto religious objects
Trees in Shinto